Cushtusia Creek is a stream in the U.S. state of Mississippi.

Cushtusia Creek is a name derived from the Choctaw language meaning "fleas are there". A variant name is "Custusha Creek".

References

Rivers of Mississippi
Rivers of Neshoba County, Mississippi
Mississippi placenames of Native American origin